Choi Seung-woo (born November 3, 1992), often anglicized  Seung Woo Choi, is a Korean mixed martial artist (MMA). Choi was the former Top Fighting Championship Featherweight Champion (Two times) and 2010 Bronze medalist at Muay Thai World Championships. He currently competes in the featherweight division in the Ultimate Fighting Championship (UFC).

Background
Choi begun practising martial arts at the age of eight, eventually representing his country in the Muay Thai World Championships. He graduated from Yong In University with a bachelor's degree.

Mixed martial arts career

Early career 
Choi started his professional MMA career since 2015 and fought under various promoters primary in Asia. He was the formal featherweight Top Fighting Championship champion (x2) and  He was signed by UFC after he won the second time the  Top FC featherweight featherweight championship with amassed a record of 7–1.

Ultimate Fighting Championship
Choi made his promotional debut on April 20, 2019 at UFC Fight Night: Overeem vs. Oleinik as a short notice replacement against Movsar Evloev. He lost the fight via unanimous decision.

Choi faced Gavin Tucker on July 27, 2019 against at UFC 240. He lost the fight via submission the third round.

Choi next faced Suman Mokhtarian on December 21, 2019 at UFC Fight Night: Edgar vs. The Korean Zombie. He won the fight via unanimous decision.

Choi was expected to face Youssef Zalal on  October 11, 2020 at UFC Fight Night 179,  but was pulled from the bout due to an undisclosed reason and was replaced by Ilia Topuria.

Choi was scheduled to meet Steven Peterson on February 6, 2021 at UFC Fight Night 184.  In turn, Peterson pulled out on January 15 due to an injury and was replaced by promotional newcomer Collin Anglin. In turn, Anglin was pulled from the event for undisclosed reason and he was replaced by Youssef Zalal.  He won the fight via unanimous decision.

Choi faced Julian Erosa on June 19, 2021 at UFC on ESPN 25. He won the fight via knockout in the first round. This fight earned him the Performance of the Night award.

Choi faced Alex Caceres on October 23, 2021 at UFC Fight Night 196. He lost the fight via rear-naked choke submission in round two.

Choi is scheduled to face Tucker Lutz on March 26, 2022 at UFC Fight Night 205.  However, Choi was forced to withraw from the event due to undisclosed injury.

Choi faced Joshua Culibao on June 11, 2022 at UFC 275. He lost the bout via split decision.

Choi faced Michael Trizano on November 12, 2022 at UFC 281. At the weigh-ins, Trizano weighed in at 147.6 pounds, one and six tenths of a pound over the featherweight non-title fight limit. The bout proceeded at a catchweight with Trizano fined 20% of his purse, which went to Choi. He lost the fight via knockout in the first round.

Championships and accomplishments

Mixed martial arts 
Ultimate Fighting Championship
Performance of the Night (One time) 
Top Fighting Championship
Top Fighting Championship] Featherweight Champion (Two times)

Muay Thai 
South Korea Muay Thai national team fighter
 Muay Thai World Championships
 2010 Bronze medal at Muay Thai World Championships

Mixed martial arts record

|-
|Loss
|align=center|10–6
|Michael Trizano
|KO (punches)
|UFC 281
|
|align=center|1
|align=center|4:51
|New York City, New York, United States
|
|-
|Loss
|align=center|10–5
|Joshua Culibao
|Decision (split)
|UFC 275
|
|align=center|3
|align=center|5:00
|Kallang, Singapore
|
|-
|Loss
|align=center|10–4
|Alex Caceres
|Submission (rear-naked choke)
|UFC Fight Night: Costa vs. Vettori
|
|align=center|2
|align=center|3:31
|Las Vegas, Nevada, United States
|
|-
|Win
|align=center|10–3
|Julian Erosa
|TKO (punches)
|UFC on ESPN: The Korean Zombie vs. Ige 
|
|align=center|1
|align=center|1:37
|Las Vegas, Nevada, United States
|
|-
|Win
|align=center|9–3
|Youssef Zalal
|Decision (unanimous)
|UFC Fight Night: Overeem vs. Volkov
|
|align=center|3
|align=center|5:00
|Las Vegas, Nevada, United States
|
|-
|Win
|align=center|8–3
|Suman Mokhtarian
|Decision (unanimous)
|UFC Fight Night: Edgar vs. The Korean Zombie
|
|align=center|3
|align=center|5:00
|Busan, South Korea
|
|-
|Loss
|align=center|7–3
|Gavin Tucker
|Submission (rear-naked choke)
|UFC 240
|
|align=center|3
|align=center|3:17
|Edmonton, Alberta, Canada
|
|-
|Loss
|align=center|7–2
|Movsar Evloev
|Decision (unanimous)
|UFC Fight Night: Overeem vs. Oleinik
|
|align=center|3
|align=center|5:00
|Saint Petersburg, Russia
|
|-
|Win
|align=center|7–1
|Jae Woong Kim
|KO (punch)
|Top FC 16
|
|align=center|2
|align=center|2:47
|Seoul, South Korea
|
|-
|Win
|align=center|6–1
|Young Bok Kil
|TKO (punches)
|Top FC 15
|
|align=center|1
|align=center|1:33
|Seoul, South Korea
|
|-
|Loss
|align=center|5–1
|Jae Woong Kim
|TKO (punches)
|Top FC 14
|
|align=center|1
|align=center|0:36
|Seoul, South Korea
|
|-
|Win
|align=center|5–0
|Min Gu Lee
|KO (punch)
|Top FC 12
|
|align=center|4
|align=center|2:38
|Seoul, South Korea
|
|-
|Win
|align=center|4–0
|Rocky Lee
|Decision (unanimous)
|Art of War 17
|
|align=center|2
|align=center|5:00
|Beijing, China
|
|-
|Win
|align=center|3–0
|Tae Seok Oh
|KO (knee)
|Top FC 10
|
|align=center|1
|align=center|1:55
|Seoul, South Korea
|
|-
|Win
|align=center|2–0
|Nurzhan Tutkaev
|Decision (unanimous)
|Kunlun Fight: Cage Fight Series 4
|
|align=center|3
|align=center|5:00
|Astana, Kazakhstan
|
|-
|Win
|align=center|1–0
|Tae Seung Yoon
|TKO (cut)
|Top FC 8
|
|align=center|1
|align=center|1:45
|Seoul, South Korea
|
|-

See also
List of current UFC fighters
List of male mixed martial artists

References

External links
  
 

1992 births
Featherweight mixed martial artists
Mixed martial artists utilizing Muay Thai
Living people
South Korean male mixed martial artists
Ultimate Fighting Championship male fighters
Kunlun Fight MMA Fighters
South Korean Muay Thai practitioners
People from Gangneung
Sportspeople from Gangwon Province, South Korea